Geocaching  is an outdoor recreational activity, in which participants use a Global Positioning System (GPS) receiver or mobile device and other navigational techniques to hide and seek containers, called "geocaches" or "caches", at specific locations marked by coordinates all over the world. As of 2021, there were over a million active players in the United States.

Geocaching can be considered a location-based game. A typical cache is a small waterproof container containing a logbook and sometimes a pen or pencil. The geocacher signs the log with their established code name and dates it, in order to prove that they found the cache. After signing the log, the cache must be placed back exactly where the person found it.  Larger containers such as plastic storage containers (Tupperware or similar) or ammo boxes can also contain items for trading, such as toys or trinkets, usually of more sentimental worth than financial. Geocaching shares many aspects with benchmarking, trigpointing, orienteering, treasure hunting, letterboxing, trail blazing, and Munzee.

History

Geocaching was originally similar to the game letterboxing (which originated in 1854), which uses clues and references to landmarks embedded in stories. Geocaching was conceived shortly after the removal of Selective Availability from the Global Positioning System on May 2, 2000 (Blue Switch Day.), because the improved accuracy of the system allowed for a small container to be specifically placed and located.

The first documented placement of a GPS-located cache took place on May 3, 2000, by Dave Ulmer of Beavercreek, Oregon. Within three days, the cache had been found twice, first by Mike Teague. According to Dave Ulmer's message, this cache was a black plastic bucket that was partially buried and contained software, videos, books, money, a can of beans, and a slingshot. The geocache and most of its contents were eventually destroyed by a lawn mower; the can of beans was the only item salvaged and was turned into a trackable item called the "Original Can of Beans". Another geocache and plaque called the Original Stash Tribute Plaque now sit at the site.

Geocaching company Groundspeak allows extraterrestrial caches, e.g. the Moon or Mars, although presently, the website provides only earthbound coordinates. The first published extraterrestrial geocache was GC1BE91, which was on the International Space Station between 2008 and 2017. It used the Baikonur launch area in Kazakhstan as its position. The original cache contained a travel bug (the first geocaching trackable item in space), which stayed on the station until it was brought back to earth in 2013. Due to fire restrictions on board the station, the geocache contained no official paper logbook. As of February 2021, only one confirmed geocacher (in 2013) has actually found the geocache, although others have claimed to have found it providing varying amounts of evidence. To commemorate the occasion, Groundspeak allowed specialized geocaching events to be published across the world, allowing attendees to obtain a virtual souvenir on their profile.

The second geocaching trackable in space is TB5EFXK  which is attached to the SHERLOC calibration target on board the Mars Perseverance Rover, which landed on Mars on 18 February 2021. Geocachers were given the opportunity to virtually discover the trackable after the WATSON camera sent back its first photographs of the calibration target that contained the tracking code number. The code is printed on a prototype helmet visor material that will be used to test how well it can withstand the Martian environment. This will help scientists in creating a viable Martian spacesuit for future crewed missions to Mars.

The activity was originally referred to as the GPS stash hunt or gpsstashing. This was changed shortly after the original hide when it was suggested in the gpsstash eGroup that "stash" could have negative connotations and the term geocaching was adopted.

Over time, a variety of different hide-and-seek-type activities have been created or abandoned, so that "geocaching" may now refer to hiding and seeking containers, or locations or information without containers.

An independent accounting of the early history documents several controversial actions taken by Jeremy Irish and Grounded, Inc., a predecessor to Groundspeak, to increase "commercialization and monopolistic control over the hobby". More recently, other similar hobbies such as Munzee have attracted some geocachers by rapidly adopting smart-phone technology, which has caused "some resistance from geocaching organizers about placing caches along with Munzees".

Geocaches

For the traditional geocache, a geocacher will place a waterproof container containing a log book (with pen and/or pencil) and trade items or trackables, then record the cache's coordinates. These coordinates, along with other details of the location, are posted on a listing site (see list of some sites below). Other geocachers obtain the coordinates from that listing site and seek out the cache using their handheld GPS receivers. The finding geocachers record their exploits in the logbook and online, but then must return the cache to the same coordinates so that other geocachers may find it. Geocachers are free to take objects (except the logbook, pencil, or stamp) from the cache in exchange for leaving something of similar or higher value.
Typical cache "treasures", also known in the geocaching world as SWAG (a backronym of "stuff we all get"), are not high in monetary value but may hold personal value to the finder. Aside from the logbook, common cache contents are unusual coins or currency, small toys, ornamental buttons, CDs, or books. Although not required, many geocachers decide to leave behind signature items, such as personal geocoins, pins, or craft items, to mark their presence at the cache location. Disposable cameras are popular as they allow for anyone who found the cache to take a picture which can be developed and uploaded to a Geocaching web site listed below. Also common are objects that are moved from cache to cache called "hitchhikers", such as Travel Bugs or geocoins, whose travels may be logged and followed online. Cachers who initially place a Travel Bug or geocoin(s) often assign specific goals for their trackable items. Examples of goals are to be placed in a certain cache a long distance from home, or to travel to a certain country, or to travel faster and farther than other hitchhikers in a race. Less common trends are site-specific information pages about the historic significance of the site, types of trees, birds in the area or other such information. Higher-value items are occasionally included in geocaches as a reward for the First to Find (called "FTF"), or in locations which are harder to reach.

Dangerous or illegal items, weapons, food, and drugs are not allowed and are specifically against the rules of most geocache listing sites.

If a geocache has been vandalized or stolen by a person who is not familiar with geocaching, it is said to have been "muggled". The term plays off the fact that those not familiar with geocaching are called muggles, a word borrowed from the Harry Potter series of books which were rising in popularity at the same time geocaching started.

Variations

Traditional geocaching gave birth to GeoCaching – an active urban game of the Encounter project. The game is quite similar to geocaching but has time limitations and hints.

Geocaches vary in size, difficulty, and location. Simple caches that are placed near a roadside are often called "drive-bys", "park 'n grabs" (PNGs), or "cache and dash". Geocaches may also be complex, involving lengthy searches, significant travel, or use of specialist equipment such as SCUBA diving, kayaking, or abseiling.  Different geocaching websites list different variations per their own policies.

Container sizes range from "nanos", particularly magnetic nanos, which can be smaller than the tip of a finger and have only enough room to store the log sheet, to 20-liter (5 gallon) buckets or even larger containers, such as entire trucks. The most common cache containers in rural areas are lunch-box-sized plastic storage containers or surplus military ammunition cans. Ammo cans are considered the gold standard of containers because they are very sturdy, waterproof, animal- and fire-resistant, and relatively cheap, and have plenty of room for trade items. Smaller containers are more common in urban areas because they can be more easily hidden.

Geocache types
Over time many variations of geocaches have developed. Different platforms often have their own rules on which types are allowed or how they are classified. The following cache types are supported by both geocaching.com and opencaching.us unless stated otherwise.

A Traditional cache is the most common type and consists of a container with a logbook. Exact coordinates where the cache is located are given.

A Multi-cache consists of one or more stages, each of them containing the coordinates for the next one; the final stage contains a physical container with the logbook. An Offset cache is a multi-cache in which the initial coordinates are for a location containing information that encodes the final cache coordinates. An example would be to direct the finder to a plaque where the digits of a date on the plaque correspond to coordinates of the final cache.

Mystery or puzzle caches require one to discover information or solve a puzzle to find the cache. Some mystery caches provide a puzzle that must be solved to determine the physical cache location. Caches that do not fit into other categories are classified as mystery caches. Posted coordinates of mystery caches are also usually bogus.

Challenge caches require a geocacher to complete a reasonably attainable geocaching-related task before being able to log the find. Examples include finding a number of caches that meet a category, completing a number of cache finds within a period of time, or finding a cache for every calendar day. On geocaching.com it is considered a subtype of the Mystery cache, while it is a type on its own on opencaching.us.

A Night cache is multi-stage and intended to be found at night by following a series of reflectors with a flashlight to the final cache location. Considered a variant of the Mystery cache on geocaching.com.

A Chirp cache is a Garmin-created innovative advance on multi-caches using new wireless beacon technology. The Chirp stores hints, multicache coordinates, counts visitors and confirms the cache is nearby. These caches were fully supported at OpenCaching.com, but they caused considerable discussion and some controversy at Groundspeak, where they were given a new "attribute".

A Wherigo cache is a multi-stage cache hunt that uses a Wherigo "cartridge" to guide the player to find a physical cache sometime during cartridge play, usually at the end. Not all Wherigo cartridges incorporate geocaches into gameplay. Wherigo caches are unique to the geocaching.com website. Wherigo is a GPS location-aware software platform initially released in January 2008. Authors can develop self-enclosed story files (called "cartridges") that are read by the Wherigo player software, installed on either a GPS unit or smartphone. The player and story take advantage of the location information provided by the GPS to trigger in-game events, such as using a virtual object or interacting with characters. Completing an adventure can require reaching different locations and solving puzzles. Cartridges are coded in Lua.  Lua may be used directly, but a builder application is usually used. The Wherigo site offers a builder application and a database of adventures free for download, though the builder has remained in its Alpha version since its last release in May 2008.  The official player is only available for Pocket PC.  A built-in player is available on Garmin Colorado and Oregon GPS models. The Wherigo Foundation was organized in December 2012.  The group is composed of all Wherigo application developers who, up until that time, had been acting and developing separately.  Their goal is to provide a consistent Wherigo experience across platforms, connect Wherigo applications via an API, and add modern features to the Wherigo platform.  While Groundspeak is aware of this project, the company has yet to take a position.

A Letterbox cache or a Letterbox hybrid cache is a combination of a geocache and a letterbox in the same container. A letterbox has a rubber stamp and a logbook instead of tradable items. Letterboxers carry their own stamp with them, to stamp the letterbox's log book and inversely stamp their personal log book with the letterbox stamp. The hybrid cache contains the important materials for this and may or may not include trade items.

Moving or traveling caches are found at a listed set of coordinates. The finder hides the cache in a different location, and updates the listing, essentially becoming the hider, and the next finder continues the cycle. This cache type is supported at opencaching.us while it has been discontinued at geocaching.com.

Guest Book caches use guest books often found in museums, tourist information centers, etc. They are listed exclusively at opencaching.us.

The following cache types don't contain a physical logbook.

A BIT cache is a laminated card with a QR code, similar to Munzee. The BIT Cache also contains a URL and a password, for logging purposes. They are listed exclusively on opencaching.us.

Virtual caches are coordinates for a location that has some other described object. Validation for finding a virtual cache generally requires one to email the cache hider with information such as a date or a name on a plaque, or to post a picture of oneself at the site with a GPS receiver in hand. New virtual caches are no longer allowed by Groundspeak as it is a legacy cache. but they remain supported by other sites. The Groundspeak website no longer lists new caches without a physical container, including virtual and webcam caches; however, older caches of these types have been grandfathered in (except for locationless or reverse, which are completely archived). On August 24, 2017, Groundspeak announced "Virtual Rewards", allowing 4000 new virtual caches to be placed during the following year. Earthcaches are one of the two exceptions to the no-container rule; they are caches in which players must answer geological questions to complete the cache. The other exception is for event caches; for an event to qualify, it must be specifically or mainly for geocachers, and must have a minimum duration dependent upon its category (CITO, regular, Mega, or Giga). Attendees of event caches can log that they 'attended', which will increment their number of found caches. Groundspeak created a waymarking website to handle all other non-physical caches.

EarthCache™ are virtual caches that are organized by the Geological Society of America, but are located in many countries. The cacher usually has to perform a task which teaches an educational lesson about the Earth science of the cache area. They are listed at geocaching.com. 

Locationless or reverse caches are similar to a scavenger hunt. A description is given for something to find, such as a one-room schoolhouse, and the finder locates an example of this object. The finder records the location using their GPS receiver and often takes a picture at the location showing the named object and his or her GPS receiver. Typically others are not allowed to log that same location as a find.

Webcam caches are virtual caches whose coordinates have a public webcam. The finder is often required to capture their image from the webcam for verification of the find. New webcam caches are no longer allowed by Groundspeak as it is a legacy cache, but they remain supported by opencaching.us.

Finally, a USB Cache or Dead Drop cache location has a USB flash drive embedded into walls or other structures. The cache is retrieved by connecting a device that has a USB port and can read standard text files. This type is available at opencaching.us.

There are a few kinds of events.

An Event Cache is a gathering organized and attended by geocachers. It is not a true cache, but is treated as such by geocaching platforms: it can be "found" upon attending the event.

Cache-In Trash-Out (CITO) Events are coordinated activities of trash pickup and other maintenance tasks (such as constructing footpaths, planting trees and removing invasive species) to improve the environment. CITO is an ongoing environmental initiative created by Groundspeak Inc. related to geocaching which encourages geocachers to clean up parks and other areas. This is done in two ways: specific events, traditionally around the time of Earth Day each year, in which groups go around picking up litter and maintaining the landscape while finding geocaches.

Finally, a GPS Adventures Maze Exhibit is an exhibit at various museums and science centers in which participants in the maze learn about geocaching. These "events" have their own cache type on geocaching.com and include many non-geocachers.

Geodashing
Geodashing is an outdoor sport in which teams of players use GPS receivers to find and visit randomly selected "dashpoints" (also called "waypoints") around the world and report what they find. The objective is to visit as many dashpoints as possible.

Unlike geocaching, nothing is to be left at the dashpoints; the sole objective is to visit them within the time limit.

The first game, organized by gpsgames.org, ran for two months (June and July 2001); each subsequent game has run for one month. Players are often encouraged to take pictures at the dashpoints and upload them to the site.

Stratocaching
Geocaching from space is a combination of flight to near space, the geocaching game, and a unique science experiment. The first Stratocaching event was held on 16 November 2013 in Prague and was successful. Ten caches and two "radioseeds" went up to  into the stratosphere on a gondola called Dropion module carried by a high-altitude balloon. The caches and seeds then fell to earth for people to find.

Technology

Obtaining data
GPX files containing information such as a cache description and information about recent visitors to the cache are available from various listing sites. Geocachers may upload geocache data (also known as waypoints) from various websites in various formats, most commonly in file-type GPX, which uses XML. Some websites allow geocachers to search (build queries) for multiple caches within a geographic area based on criteria such as ZIP code or coordinates, downloading the results as an email attachment on a schedule. In recent years, Android and iPhone users can download apps such as GeoBeagle that allow them to use their 3G and GPS-enabled devices to actively search for and download new caches.

Converting and filtering data
A variety of geocaching applications are available for geocache data management, file-type translation, and personalization. Geocaching software can assign special icons or search (filter) for caches based on certain criteria (e.g. distance from an assigned point, difficulty, date last found).

Paperless geocaching means hunting a geocache without a physical printout of the cache description. Traditionally, this means that the seeker has an electronic means of viewing the cache information in the field, such as pre-downloading the information to a PDA or other electronic device. Various applications can directly upload and read GPX files without further conversion. Newer GPS devices released by Garmin, DeLorme, and Magellan have the ability to read GPX files directly, thus eliminating the need for a PDA. Other methods include viewing real-time information on a portable computer with internet access or with an Internet-enabled smart phone. The latest advancement of this practice involves installing dedicated applications on a smart phone with a built-in GPS receiver. Seekers can search for and download caches in their immediate vicinity directly to the application and use the on-board GPS receiver to find the cache.

A more controversial version of paperless caching involves mass-downloading only the coordinates and cache names (or waypoint IDs) for hundreds of caches into older receivers. This is a common practice of some cachers and has been used successfully for years. In many cases, however, the cache description and hint are never read by the seeker before hunting the cache. This means they are unaware of potential restrictions such as limited hunt times, park open/close times, off-limit areas, and suggested parking locations.

Mobile devices
The website geocaching.com now sells mobile applications which allow users to view caches through a variety of different devices. Currently, the Android, iPhone, and Windows Phone mobile platforms have applications in their respective stores. The apps also allow for a trial version with limited functionality. The site promotes mobile applications, and lists over two dozen applications (both mobile and browser/desktop based) that are using their proprietary but royalty-free public application programming interface (API). Developers at c:geo have criticised Groundspeak for being incompatible with open-source development.

Additionally "c:geo - opensource" is a free opensource full function application for Android phones that is very popular.  This app includes similar features to the official Geocaching mobile application, such as: View caches on a live map (Google Maps or OpenStreetMap), navigation using a compass, map, or other applications, logging finds online and offline, etc.

Geocaching enthusiasts have also made their own hand-held GPS devices using a Lego Mindstorms NXT GPS sensor.

Ethics
Geocache listing websites have their own guidelines for acceptable geocache publications. Government agencies and others responsible for public use of land often publish guidelines for geocaching, and a "Geocacher's Creed" posted on the Internet asks participants to "avoid causing disruptions or public alarm". Generally accepted rules are to not endanger others, to minimize the impact on nature, to respect private property, and to avoid public alarm.

Reception
The reception from authorities and the general public outside geocache participants has been mixed.

Cachers have been approached by police and questioned when they were seen as acting suspiciously. Other times, investigation of a cache location after suspicious activity was reported has resulted in police and bomb squad discovery of the geocache, such as the evacuation of a busy street in Wetherby, Yorkshire, England in 2011, and a street in Alvaston, Derby in 2020.

Schools have been evacuated when a cache has been seen by teachers or police, such as the case of Fairview High School in Boulder, Colorado in 2009. A number of caches have been destroyed by bomb squads. Diverse locations, from rural cemeteries to Disneyland, have been locked down as a result of such scares.

The placement of geocaches has occasional critics among some government personnel and the public at large, who consider it littering. Some geocachers act to mitigate this perception by picking up litter while they search for geocaches, a practice referred to in the community as "Cache In Trash Out". Events and caches are often organized revolving around this practice, with many areas seeing significant cleanup that would otherwise not take place, or would instead require federal, state, or local funds to accomplish. Geocachers are also encouraged to clean up after themselves by retrieving old containers once a cache has been removed from play.

Geocaching is legal in most countries and is usually positively received when explained to law enforcement officials. However, certain types of placements can be problematic. Although generally disallowed, hiders could place caches on private property without adequate permission (intentionally or otherwise), which encourages cache finders to trespass. Historic buildings and structures have also been damaged by geocachers, who have wrongly believed the geocache to be placed within, or on the roof of, the buildings.
Caches might also be hidden in places where the act of searching can make a finder look suspicious (e.g., near schools, children's playgrounds, banks, courthouses, or in residential neighborhoods), or where the container placement could be mistaken for a drug stash or a bomb (especially in urban settings, under bridges, near banks, courthouses, or embassies). As a result, geocachers are strongly advised to label their geocaches where possible, so that they are not mistaken for a harmful object if discovered by non-geocachers.

As well as concerns about littering and bomb threats, some geocachers have hidden their caches in inappropriate locations, such as electrical boxes, which may encourage risky behavior, especially by children. Hides in these areas are discouraged, and cache listing websites enforce guidelines that disallow certain types of placements. However, as cache reviewers typically cannot see exactly where and how every cache is hidden, problematic hides can slip through. Ultimately it is also up to cache finders to use discretion when attempting to search for a cache, and report any problems.

Laws and legislation
Regional rules for placement of caches have become complex. For example, in Virginia, the Virginia Department of Transportation and the Wildlife Management Agency now forbids the placement of geocaches on all land controlled by those agencies. Some cities, towns, and recreation areas allow geocaches with few or no restrictions, but others require compliance with lengthy permitting procedures.

The South Carolina House of Representatives passed Bill 3777 in 2005, stating, "It is unlawful for a person to engage in the activity of geocaching or letterboxing in a cemetery or in a historic or archaeological site or property publicly identified by a historical marker without the express written consent of the owner or entity which oversees that cemetery site or property." The bill was referred to committee on first reading in the Senate and has been there ever since.

The Illinois Department of Natural Resources requires geocachers who wish to place a geocache at any Illinois state park to submit the location on a USGS 7.5 minute topographical map, the name and contact information of the person(s) wishing to place the geocache, a list of the original items to be included in the geocache, and a picture of the container that is to be placed.

In April 2020, during the COVID-19 pandemic, the township of Highlands East, Ontario, Canada temporarily banned geocaching, over concerns that geocache containers cannot be properly disinfected between finds.

Notable incidents

Several deaths have occurred while caching.

The death of a 21-year-old experienced cacher in December 2011 "while attempting a Groundspeak cache that does not look all that dangerous" led to discussions of whether changes should be made, and whether cache owners or Groundspeak could be held liable. Groundspeak has since updated their geocaching.com terms of use agreement to specify that geocachers find geocaches at their own risk.

In 2008, two lost hikers on Mount Hood in Oregon, U.S. stumbled across a geocache and phoned this information out to rescuers, allowing crews to locate and rescue them.

Three adult geocachers, a 24-year-old woman and her parents, were trapped in a cave and rescued by firefighters in Rochester, New York, U.S. while searching for a geocache in 2012. Rochester Fire Department spokesman Lt. Ted Kuppinger said, "It's difficult, because you're invested in it, you want to find something like that, so people will probably try to push themselves more than they should, but you need to be prudent about what you're capable of doing."

In 2015, Her Majesty's Coastguard were called to a group of geocachers who were spotted walking into the Severn Estuary off the coast of Clevedon, England, in search of clues to locate a multi-cache. Although they felt they were safe and able to return to land, they were considered to be in danger and were airlifted back to the shore.

In October 2016, four people discovered a crashed car at the bottom of a ravine in Benton, Washington, U.S., while out geocaching. They spotted the driver still trapped inside and alerted emergency services, who rescued the driver.

On 9 June 2018, four people in Prague, Czech Republic were searching for a cache in 4 km long tunnel when a storm surge carried them through the tunnel to its terminus at the Vltava river. Two of the geogachers died, while two others were rescued from the river.

Websites and data ownership
Numerous websites list geocaches around the world. Geocaching websites vary in many ways, including control of data.

First page
The first website to list geocaches was announced by Mike Teague on May 8, 2000. On September 2, 2000, Jeremy Irish emailed the gpsstash mailing list that he had registered the domain name geocaching.com and had set up his own Web site. He copied the caches from Mike Teague's database into his own. On September 6, Mike Teague announced that Jeremy Irish was taking over cache listings. , Teague had logged only 5 caches.

Geocaching.com

The largest site is Geocaching.com, owned by Groundspeak Inc., which began operating in late 2000. With a worldwide membership and a freemium business model, the website claims millions of caches and members in over 200 countries. Hides and events are reviewed by volunteer regional cache reviewers before publication. Free membership allows users access to coordinates, descriptions, and logs for some caches; for a fee, users are allowed additional search tools, the ability to download large amounts of cache information onto their gps at once, instant email notifications about new caches, and access to premium-member-only caches. Geocaching Headquarters are located in the Fremont neighborhood of Seattle, Washington, United States.

Opencaching Network

The Opencaching Network provides independent, non-commercial listing sites based in the cacher's country or region. The Opencaching Network lists the most types of caches, including traditional, virtual, moving, multi, quiz, webcam, BIT, guest book, USB, event, and MP3. The Opencaching Network is less restrictive than many sites, and does not charge for the use of the sites, the service being community driven. Some (or all) listings may or may not be required to be reviewed by community volunteers before being published and although cross-listing is permitted, it is discouraged. Some listings are listed on other sites, but there are many that are unique to the Opencaching Network. Features include the ability to organize one's favourite caches, build custom searches, be instantly notified of new caches in one's area, seek and create caches of all types, export GPX queries, statpics, etc. Each Opencaching Node provides the same API for free (called "OKAPI") for use by developers who want to create third-party applications which can use the Opencaching Network's content.

Countries with associated opencaching websites include the United States at www.opencaching.us; Germany at www.opencaching.de; Sweden at www.opencaching.se; Poland at www.opencaching.pl; Czech Republic at www.opencaching.cz; The Netherlands at www.opencaching.nl; Romania at www.opencaching.ro; the United Kingdom at www.opencache.uk.

The main difference between opencaching and traditional listing sites is that all services are open to the users at no cost. Generally, most geocaching services or websites offer some basic information for free, but users may have to pay for premium membership that allows access to more information or advanced searching capabilities. This is not the case with opencaching; every geocache is listed and accessible to everyone for free.

Additionally, Opencaching sites allow users to rate and report on existing geocaches. This allows users to see what other cachers think of the cache and it encourages participants to place higher quality caches. The rating system also greatly reduces the problem of abandoned or unsatisfactory caches still being listed after repeated negative comments or posts in the cache logs.

OpenCaching.com
OpenCaching.com (short: OX) was a site created and run by Garmin from 2010 to 2015, which had the stated aim of being as free and open as possible with no paid content. Caches were approved by a community process and coordinates were available without an account. The service closed on 14 August 2015.

Other sites
In many countries there are regional geocaching sites, but these mostly only compile lists of caches in the area from the three main sites. Many of them also accept unique listings of caches for their site, but these listings tend to be less popular than the international sites, although occasionally the regional sites may have more caches than the international sites. There are some exceptions though, e.g. in the former Soviet Union, the site Geocaching.su remains popular because it accepts listings in the Cyrillic script. Additional international sites include Geocaching.de, a German website, and Geocaching Australia, which accepts listings of cache types deprecated by geocaching.com, cache types such as TrigPoint and Moveable caches, as well as traditional geocache types.

GPSgames
GPSgames.org is an online community dedicated to all kinds of games involving Global Positioning System receivers. GPSgames.org allows traditional geocaches as well as virtual, locationless, and traveler geocaches. Geodashing, Shutterspot, GeoVexilla, MinuteWar, GeoPoker, and GeoGolf are among the GPS games available. GPSgames.org has been 100% free since 2001, through donations.

NaviCache
Navicache.com started as a regional listing service in 2001. While many of the website's listings have been posted to other sites, it also offers unique listings. The website lists nearly any type of geocache and does not charge to access any of the caches listed in its database. All submissions are reviewed and approved. In 2012 it was announced that Navicache was under transition to new owners, who said they "plan to develop a site that geocachers want, with rules that geocachers think are suitable. Geocaching.com and OX are both backed by large enterprises, and while that means they have more funding and people, we're a much smaller team – so our advantage is the ability to be dynamic and listen to the users.". However, as of 2021 the site is mostly dormant, and the most recent cache listing is from 2014.

TerraCaching
Terracaching.com seeks to provide high-quality caches made so by the difficulty of the hide or from the quality of the location. Membership is managed through a sponsorship system, and each cache is under continual peer review from other members. Terracaching.com embraces virtual caches alongside traditional or multi-stage caches and includes many locationless caches among the thousands of caches in its database. It is increasingly attracting members who like the point system. In Europe, TerraCaching is supported by Terracaching.eu. This site is translated in different European languages, has an extended FAQ and extra supporting tools for TerraCaching. TerraCaching strongly discourages caches that are listed on other sites (so-called double-listing).

Extremcaching
Extremcaching is a German private database for alternative geocaches with a focus on T5 / climbing caches, night caches, and lost place caches. For extreme caching all you need is an extreme caching account and a GPS device with coordinates or a GPS-enabled smartphone with geocaching or outdoor navigation software, e.g. c:geo.

Geocaching Australia
Geocaching Australia is a community website for geocachers in Australia and New Zealand. Geocaching Australia also has many unique cache types such as Burke And Wills, Moveable_cache & Podcache geocaches.

See also

 Augmented reality
 Benchmarking
 BookCrossing
 Dead drop
 Degree Confluence Project
 Encounter
 Geohashing
 Ingress (video game)
 Location-based game
 Munzee
 Orienteering
 Pokémon Go
 Puzzle hunt
 Questing
 Transmitter hunting

References

Further reading

External links

In Wisconsin: Geocaching Video produced by Wisconsin Public Television
FTF Geocacher Magazine Print Magazine devoted to geocaching
geocaching.com The official geocaching website

 
Geosocial networking
Global Positioning System
Hobbies
Internet object tracking
Outdoor locating games
Scoutcraft